Peceli Vuniyayawa is a Fijian rugby league footballer who represented Fiji in the 2000 World Cup.

Playing career
Vuniyayawa played in two matches for Fiji at the 2000 World Cup. He played club football for Queanbeyan in the Canberra Rugby League competition.

References

Living people
Fijian rugby league players
Fiji national rugby league team players
Fijian expatriate rugby league players
Expatriate rugby league players in Australia
Fijian expatriates in Australia
I-Taukei Fijian people
Year of birth missing (living people)